Guadeloupe Women's National Football Team is the national team of Guadeloupe. They have only played in very few matches.

History
In 1985, almost no country in the world had a women's national football team. The team did not play in any notable matches in 2008. Guadeloupe women's national football team participated in the 2000 Caribbean Women's Championships. In the first game at home on 30 April, they beat Martinique 3–0.  On the return leg in Martinique on 21 May, they lost 1–5.

Background
Ligue Guadeloupéenne de Football is the sport's governing association in the country but they are associated with Fédération Française de Football. In 2008, 28.7% of the sport participants in the country were women.

Results

2010

2011

2012

2013

2014

2018

2019

2021

References

External links
Official website

Caribbean women's national association football teams
women